The Claysburg-Kimmel School District is a small rural public school district that spans portions of two counties in central Pennsylvania. In Bedford County it covers Kimmel Township. In Blair County it covers Greenfield Township. According to 2009 local census data, it serves a resident population of 5,513. In 2009, the district residents’ per capita income was $14,828, while the median family income was $34,038. In the Commonwealth, the median family income was $49,501 and the United States median family income was $49,445, in 2010.

Schools
 Claysburg-Kimmel Elementary School (Grades K-6)240 CK Elementary Drive, Claysburg, Pennsylvania 16625
 Claysburg-Kimmel Jr./Sr. High School (Grades 7-12)531 Bedford Street, Claysburg, Pennsylvania 16625

Extracurriculars
The district offers a variety of clubs, activities and sports.

Athletics
The District funds:

Boys
Baseball - A
Basketball - A
Football - A
Wrestling	 - AA

Girls
Basketball - A
Softball - A
Volleyball - A

Junior high school sports

Boys
Baseball
Basketball
Football
Wrestling	

Girls
Basketball
Softball
Volleyball

According to PIAA directory July 2012

References

External links
 Claysburg-Kimmel School District
 PIAA

School districts in Bedford County, Pennsylvania
School districts in Blair County, Pennsylvania